Robert J. "Bob" Brinkworth (born May 10, 1942) is a Canadian retired ice hockey Center and coach who was a two-time All-American  and ECAC Player of the Year for Rensselaer.

Career
Brinkworth was recruited to Rensselaer Polytechnic Institute by the legendary Ned Harkness and began playing with the varsity team in 1961. As a sophomore he led the team in scoring, recording more than three points per game, and finished second in the nation with 71 points. He made the inaugural First Team All-ECAC roster and was a major reason for the Engineers making the ECAC Tournament. Unfortunately, the team lost their quarterfinal match and ended their season in a disappointing fashion. As a junior Brinkwork again led the team in scoring and was third in the nation with 75 points. This time he received increasing attention for his efforts and was named an All-American as well as the ECAC Player of the Year. Despite his performance, Rensselaer played rather poorly during the season and didn't even make the conference tournament.

Harkness left prior to Brinkworth's senior season to take over at Cornell. The coach was replaced by Rube Bjorkman (who would leave after the 1964 season) and the team rebounded with a much better campaign. Brinkworth was named team co-captain with Jerry Knightley and got the team to post an 18–8 record and return to the conference tournament. Brinkworth helped the team with its first ECAC tournament game but couldn't overcome the stout defense of St. Lawrence in the semifinal. RPI won what they thought was Brinkworth's final college game over long-time rival Clarkson to finish third in the tournament and Brinkworth was named to the All-Tournament First Team. When the NCAA selection committee passed over St. Lawrence in favor of RPI for the NCAA Tournament, Brinkworth had one last chance to make an impact with the Engineers. While the team lest to Denver in the semifinal, they recovered for a 2–1 win over Providence in the consolation game and Brinkworth able to end on a high note. He finished the season as the second highest scorer in the nation for the second time, behind only Knightley with 70 points.

After graduating, Brinkworth turned to a professional career, joining the Omaha Knights in the second season of the CPHL. The following year Brinkworth jumped up to the AHL, playing with the Providence Reds and Baltimore Clippers over four seasons. He was never able to get a call-up to the NHL, however, and moved to the IHL in 1970. In his first season with the Port Huron Flags the team finished 6th out of 7 teams but made the postseason and went on a stunning run. The Flags won the championship with Brinkworth leading the way, scoring 10 goals and 18 points in 14 games. The next season the team finished second in their division and went on a second postseason run to capture their second consecutive Turner Cup. Brinkworth spent two more seasons with Port Huron before retiring as a player.

Brinkworh began his second career as a coach, working with amateur and professional teams for many seasons. In 2004 he became the head coach for Florida Gulf Coast and headed the school's club team for 15 seasons. He was the American Collegiate Hockey Association Division II coach of the year in 2009. He was inducted into the RPI Athletic Hall of Fame in 1968.

Career statistics

Regular season and playoffs

Awards and honors

References

External links

1942 births
Living people
AHCA Division I men's ice hockey All-Americans
Baltimore Clippers players
Canadian ice hockey centres
RPI Engineers men's ice hockey players
Omaha Knights (CHL) players
Port Huron Flags players
Ice hockey people from Toronto